Trichophaga mormopis is a moth of the family Tineidae. It was first described by Edward Meyrick in 1935. It is widely distributed from Africa to India, Sri Lanka, Malaya, Taiwan and Fiji. It was first recorded from Hawaii in 1944.

The wingspan is 6–8 mm.

The larvae feed on a variety of dead materials, including fur, skin, woolen materials and feathers.

External links

Tineinae
Insects of the Democratic Republic of the Congo
Fauna of the Gambia
Fauna of Seychelles
Insects of Tanzania
Moths of Africa
Moths described in 1935